The Legend of Suriyothai is a 2001 Thai film directed by Chatrichalerm Yukol, which portrays the life of Queen Suriyothai, who is regarded by Thai people as the "great feminist". It records the climax when she takes her battle elephant in front of the Burmese army and sacrifices herself to save the life of her King Maha Chakkraphat and his kingdom. It was Thailand's most expensive film and the highest-grossing, until it was surpassed by Pee Mak.

Plot
The story follows the course of the life of Suriyothai from her adolescence to her death. As Suriyothai is only known from three lines in a chronicle, most of the film relies on an invented story rather than claiming to be actual history. It presents a young woman, Suriyothai, of minor royal standing who has strong opinions and self-determination. The movie reveals the princess' boldness through scenes where she breaks tradition by walking among the commoners to meet her lover Prince Pirenthorathep, who in turn pledges that he will come to her aid whenever she wants.

Her father insists that she must marry Prince Thienraja, the son of the second king of the realm. In an attempt to escape a marriage she does not want, she runs away and is captured by the principal king who explains the possible problems her marriage to Piren might cause to Siam. For the good of the kingdom, she marries Prince Tien to keep peace in the royal families. From this point on she remains loyal to the man she likes but does not love and remains strongly independent.

The principal king dies, and Tien's father inherits the throne. A few years later, smallpox makes its first appearance in Siam and the king is stricken with the disease. On his deathbed he extracts a promise of support for his young son from Chai Raja, his nephew, and Tien. Burma invades in the north and Chai Raja assumes the throne to protect Siam. He executes the child king, which Tien protests but on Suriyothai's advice accepts Chai Raja as his ruler.

Chai Raja's wife, Queen Jitravadee, dies shortly after giving birth to the heir Yodfa. The king takes a new consort, Srisudachan, and has a son by her. After several years of peace, Chai Raja leaves the capital, Ayutthaya, for a military campaign in the north. Soon after, Srisudachan, descended from the deposed U-Tong dynasty, takes Boonsri Worawongsa, another U-Tong descendant, as a lover and starts plotting to take over the throne.

The king is wounded in battle and comes back to the capital to recuperate, where Srisudachan poisons him and attempts to blame the deed on Tien. Tien saves his own life by becoming a Buddhist monk. Srisudachan proceeds by naming Worawongsa as regent and promptly poisoning young Yodfa, thereby assuming power. Suriyothai then summons her old friend Piren, who was Chai Raja's troop commander, to help set things right. His troops ambush and kill Worawongsa and Sri Sudachan, and Tien accepts the throne despite his monkhood.

Upon hearing this, Burmese King Hongsa invades again and lays siege to Ayutthaya. In a dramatic finale, however, the Burmese invade the new kingdom, and Queen Suriyothai heroically rides into battle with her husband and her unrequited childhood love at her side. The queen is slain, falling in slow motion from the elephant in full uniform with her throat cut. The ending scene reveals a traditional funeral for royals.

Cast
 ML Piyapas Bhirombhakdi as Queen Suriyothai
 Sarunyoo Wongkrachang as King Maha Chakkraphat (Prince Thien Rajah)
 Chatchai Plengpanich as Lord Pirenthorathep
 Johnny Anfone as Lord Worawongsa
 Mai Charoenpura as Lady Sri Sudachan
 Sinjai Plengpanich as Lady Srichulalak
 Sorapong Chatree as Viscount Rajseneha
 Sombat Metanee as Lord Mingyi Thihathu
 Suphakit Tangthatswasd as King Tabinshwehti
 Saharat Sangkapreecha as Lord Bayinnaung
 Ronrittichai Khanket  as Viceroy of Pyay
 Warut Woradhamm as Sihatu
 Pongpat Wachirabunjong as King Chairachathirat
 Phimonrat (Kob) Phisarayabud as Young Suriyothai and Princess Sawadirat
 Amphol Lampoon as Lord Intarathep
 Penpak Sirikul as Queen Jiraprapa
 Chompoonut (VJ Alex) Sawaetwong as Princess Baromdilok
 Jeeranan (May) Kitprasan as Princess Thep kasattri

The film stars another Thai royal, Piyapas Bhirombhakdi, as Queen Srisuriyothai. She is a royal descendant, carrying the title M.L., or Mom Luang.

Thai pop star Mai Charoenpura is among the highlighted performers, portraying the scheming Lady Sri sudachan. Other cast members include Sarunyu Wongkrachang as Prince Thien, Chatchai Plengpanich as Lord Piren and Johnny Anfone as Lord Worawongsa.

Other actors and actresses from Thai film history appear, including action-movie veteran Sombat Metanee and Sorapong Chatree, who appeared in many of Chatrichalerm's films in the 1970s and 1980s.

Production

Background
The film was financed by Queen Sirikit, who appointed royal family members to the directorial position (Chatrichalerm) and to the role of the lead actress. Chatrichalerm wrote the screenplay and directed. Kamla, his wife, designed the costumes and served as a producer. Because of Queen Sirikit's backing, when the script called for a large number of men in the battle scenes, Royal Thai Army and Royal Thai Navy personnel were called upon to help make up the thousands of extras required.

Chatrichalerm states that The Legend of Suriyothai was originally the idea of Queen Sirikit. According to Chatrichalerm, the Queen wanted the Thai people to have a better understanding of their history and felt that a motion picture would be a good way to accomplish this. Chatrichalerm and Queen Sirikit mutually agreed to use Suriyothai as their first subject.

Documents sent to King John III of Portugal (1521–1557) from Domingos de Seixas, a mercenary in the Ayutthaya Kingdom from 1524 to 1549, were consulted. The film depicts some Portuguese, and their introduction of Early Modern warfare, but the only one with a speaking part was a physician called to the deathbed of the poisoned king. A follow-up film on King Naresuan, King Naresuan was released in 2007.

Amporn Jirattikorn argues that other motivations for the film included a fear of foreign influence after the 1997 Asian financial crisis and competition from another historical figure, the sister to King Naresuan. According to Jirattikorn, the film attempts to provide a national hero connected to the current monarchical dynasty, in contrast to other Thai films presenting events of the same era (e.g., Bang Rajan).

The movie uses many locations and sites in Thailand as its sets and with its massive cast and expensive production richly displays life in the 16th century. The battle scenes employed thousands of extras and there are hundreds of real elephants used as moving battle platforms. It took three years to shoot. It is rumored that the film cost between US$8 and 20 million, making it the most expensive Thai film ever made. However, due to the involvement of the Thai Royal Family, any figure is hard to substantiate. Additionally, the royal family’s association with this motion picture allowed filming in locations that would have been difficult or even impossible for any other director to access.

Alternative versions
When the film was released on August 12, 2001 in Thailand, it was simply titled Suriyothai and had a running time of 185 minutes. This is pared down quite a bit from its intended eight-hour length. A five-hour version exists in a DVD box-set released in Thailand.

In 2003, it was released in the United States, with a running time of 142 minutes. This version was edited by Francis Ford Coppola. The US release by Sony Pictures Classics in association with Coppola's company American Zoetrope was entitled Francis Ford Coppola Presents: The Legend of Suriyothai. Some critics argue that the original Thai release was the better presentation of the film, with others even preferring the five-hour DVD set, which does have English subtitles.

Reception

Critical reception
In his review of The Legend of Suriyothai in technohistory.com, Steve Sanderson states "The film's celebration of female power is initially refreshing, suggesting some nascent feminist impulse."

When she marries Prince Tien to keep peace she remains loyal to the man she likes but does not love and remains independent. According to The New York Times review, this sacrifice is act of placing patriotic duty and family loyalty over her own feelings.

On Rotten Tomatoes the film has an approval rating of 51% based on reviews from 61 critics. On Metacritic the film has a score of 58% based on reviews from 21 critics.

Box office
The film was the highest-grossing film of all-time in Thailand with a reported gross of $14 million, three-times as much as Titanic. It was number one at the Thai box office for five weeks. The film grossed $458,564 in the United States and Canada.

See also

 List of historical drama films of Asia

References

External links
 

2001 films
2000s historical films
American Zoetrope films
Biographical action films
Cultural depictions of Thai monarchs
Epic films based on actual events
Films set in the 16th century
Films set in Thailand
Films set in Myanmar
Films scored by Richard Harvey
Films shot in Thailand
Sahamongkol Film International films
Sony Pictures Classics films
Thai biographical films
Thai historical films
Thai-language films
Thai national heritage films
Thai war films
History of Thailand in fiction